Yuri Vladimirovich Bystritsky (born 31 July 1944) is a Russian football manager.

Career
Bystritsky was the head coach of the Russia women's national team at the 1999 FIFA Women's World Cup and 2003 FIFA Women's World Cup.

References

External links
 
 
 
 Yuri Bystritsky at Soccerdonna.de 

1944 births
Living people
Russian football managers
Women's association football managers
Russia women's national football team managers
1999 FIFA Women's World Cup managers
2003 FIFA Women's World Cup managers